Kalat-e Hay-ye Gharbi Rural District is a rural district (dehestan) in Bastam District, Shahrud County, Semnan Province, Iran. At the 2006 census, its population was 3,456, in 976 families.  The rural district has 4 villages.

References 

Rural Districts of Semnan Province
Shahrud County